L. G. O. Woodhouse was the 18th Surveyor General of Ceylon. He was appointed in 1937, succeeding G. K. Thornhill, and held the office until 1943. He was succeeded by R. J. Johnston.

References

W